William Blair Tennent  (4 December 1898 – 1 May 1976), known as Blair Tennent, was a New Zealand politician of the National Party and a cabinet minister. In Palmerston North he was a dentist, and a local body politician.

Early life
Tennent was born at Greymouth on 4 December 1898 to Elizabeth Blair and her husband, David Tennent. He was dux at Greymouth District High School.

Local body politics
Tennent was a councillor for Palmerston North City Council from 1933 to 1941. He was Mayor of Palmerston North from 1956 to 1959.

He was on the Board of Governors for Palmerston North Boys' High School, and in 1954 led the conservative opposition to the appointment of Guthrie Wilson to head either Palmerston North Boys' High School or Freyberg High School because of the frank and sexually explicit language in his novels.

Member of Parliament

Tennent represented the Palmerston North electorate from 1949 to 1954, when he was defeated by Philip Skoglund. He then represented the Manawatu electorate from 1957 to 1966, when he retired.

He was Minister of Education in the Second National Government from 1960 to 1963.

In 1953, Tennent was awarded the Queen Elizabeth II Coronation Medal.

Later life
He was appointed a Commander of the Order of the British Empire, for services in politics and education, in the 1973 New Year Honours. Tennent died at his home in Palmerston North on 1 May 1976.

References

Further reading

|-

1898 births
1976 deaths
New Zealand National Party MPs
Members of the Cabinet of New Zealand
Mayors of Palmerston North
People from Greymouth
New Zealand education ministers
Members of the New Zealand House of Representatives
New Zealand MPs for North Island electorates
New Zealand dentists
New Zealand Commanders of the Order of the British Empire
Unsuccessful candidates in the 1954 New Zealand general election
Chancellors of Massey University
Palmerston North City Councillors
People educated at Greymouth High School
20th-century dentists